Arthroaspis is an extinct genus of arthropod known from the Cambrian aged Sirius Passet Lagerstatte in Greenland. It is relatively large in size for Cambrian arthropods, attaining a length of up to 215 mm. It is a common component of the Passet fauna, being located at multiple localities within the formation. It possessed 14 tergites. In the describing paper, it was recovered as a member of a non-monophyletic Artiopoda. It has subsequently been considered a potential close relative of nektaspids.

References 

Artiopoda